The European Cycle Messenger Championships (ECMC) is an annual competition for European bicycle messengers.

The first ECMC was held in Hamburg in 1996. This was originally planned as the 2nd German Cycle Messenger Championships (GCMC/DMFK), but was turned into a European championship due to large participation of Dutch and Danish messengers.

List 
 1st ECMC 1996 Hamburg, Germany
 ECMC 1997 Amsterdam, Netherlands
 ECMC 1998 Graz, Austria
 ECMC 1999 Gijón, Spain
 ECMC 2000 Freiburg, Germany
 ECMC 2001 Rotterdam, Netherlands
 ECMC 2002 Dublin, Ireland
 ECMC 2003 London, UK
 ECMC 2004 Warschau, Poland
 10th ECMC 2005 Basel, Switzerland
 ECMC 2006 Helsinki, Finland
 ECMC 2007 Oslo, Norway
 ECMC 2008 Eindhoven, Netherlands
 ECMC 2009 Berlin, Germany
 ECMC 2010 Budapest, Hungary
 ECMC 2011 Madrid, Spain
 ECMC 2012 Edinburgh, Scotland/UK
 ECMC 2013 Bern, Switzerland
 ECMC 2014 Stockholm, Sweden
 20th ECMC 2015 Milano, Italy
 ECMC 2016 Copenhagen, Denmark
 ECMC 2017 Vienna, Austria
 ECMC 2018 Szczecin, Poland
 ECMC 2019 Brussels, Belgium
 No event was held in 2020 due to the ongoing COVID-19 pandemic
 ECMC 2021 Basel, Switzerland
 ECMC 2022 Bremen, Germany

See also 
 Cycle Messenger World Championships

Sources 

Cycle racing in Europe